Sardenaira (pissalandrea, or pizza all'Andrea, or piscialandrea, or pizzalandrea, or pissadella, or sardenaira) is a pizza dish, without cheese, from the Liguria region of Italy. It is very similar to the pissaladière. Although termed a pizza, some consider it more akin to a focaccia.

In the city of Sanremo in western Liguria, it is garnished with salted anchovies, local olives, garlic cloves, and capers.

It is known as sardenaira or pizza all'Andrea, after admiral Andrea Doria (1466–1560), whose favorite food was the dish: a slice of bread with olive oil, garlic, and salted anchovy.

The dish predates the better-known Neapolitan pizza. Since the dish was created before the Columbian Exchange, traditionalists do not add tomatoes.

See also
 Cuisine of Liguria
 List of Italian dishes

Notes

Italian cuisine
Pizza styles
Cuisine of Liguria
Anchovy dishes
Street food in Italy